Unconditional is Ana Popović's fifth studio album, released on August 16, 2011 on Eclecto Groove Records, her last on that label. The album features some guest slide guitar work with Sonny Landreth. Popović states in her liner notes that the title Unconditional is her mission statement and her state of being.

Track list

Personnel

Musicians
 Ana Popović – vocals, electric guitar, acoustic guitar, slide guitar
 Sonny Landreth – slide guitar (track 5)
 Calvin Turner – bass
 Doug Belote – drums
 Leon "Kid Chocolate" Brown – trumpet
 Tom Fitzpatrick – saxophone
 Jon Cleary – keys (all tracks except 8 & 10)
 David Torkanowski – keys (tracks 8 & 10)
 Jason Ricci – harmonica (track 2)
 Avist Martin Mycartery "Scooter" Groce, Jerome Alexander – background vocals

Production
 Randy Chortkoff - executive producer
 Ana Popović - production
 John Porter - production, recording, engineering, mixing and mastering (Recorded February 17–23 in the Piety Studios, New Orleans, LA, and February 23–27 in the Jon Cleary Studio, New Orleans)
 Wesley Fontenot - recording and engineering
 Mike Dorsey – additional engineering

References

2011 albums
Ana Popović albums